Trung may refer to:

 Hồ Văn Trung (giant), Vietnamese man who grew to 8 ft 5 in (2.57m)

Derung people, also known as Trung people, an ethnic minority in southwest China
Derung language, also known as the Trung language, a Sino-Tibetan language spoken by Derung people
Trưng Sisters ( 12–43), Vietnamese sisters who rebelled against the Eastern Han dynasty
T'rưng, a bamboo xylophone used by the Jarai people and Bahnar people in Vietnam's Central Highlands

See also
Taraon language, a Sino-Tibetan language spoken in Arunachal Pradesh, India
Taron people, an ethnic minority in northern Myanmar, possibly descendants of the Derung people
Zhong (disambiguation)